Wuchuan (Wuchwan) may refer to three county-level divisions of the People's Republic of China:

Wuchuan, Guangdong, Zhanjiang, Guangdong
Wuchuan County, Inner Mongolia, Hohhot, Inner Mongolia
Wuchuan Gelao and Miao Autonomous County, Zunyi, Guizhou